Syola is a rural locality (a selo) and the administrative center of Syolskoye Rural Settlement, Chusovoy Urban Okrug, Perm Krai, Russia. The population was 724 as of 2010. There are 9 streets.

Geography 
Syola is located 65 km southwest of Chusovoy. Bereznik is the nearest rural locality.

References 

Rural localities in Perm Krai
Chusovoy Urban Okrug